St Augustine Papey was a mediaeval church in the City of London situated just south of London Wall opposite the north end of St. Mary Axe Street. First mentioned as "Sci augustini pappey", it originally belonged to the Priory of Holy Trinity. By 1430, the emoluments had become so small that it was united with All Hallows-on-the-Wall and in 1442 was appropriated as an almshouse for elderly clergy. At the time of the Dissolution of the Monasteries it was demolished and the site built over. The churchyard was acquired by St Martin Outwich in 1539, and survives to this day on Camomile Street

Notes

12th-century church buildings in England
1547 disestablishments in England
Churches in the City of London
Former buildings and structures in the City of London